Birger Gerhardsson (26 September 1926 – 25 December 2013) was a Swedish New Testament scholar and professor in the Faculty of Theology at Lund University, Sweden. His primary academic focus was on the transmission and development of the oral traditions of the New Testament gospels.

Selected works

Thesis

Books

References

External links
 Birger Gerhardsson's profile at Baker Publishing Group

Swedish theologians
Swedish biblical scholars
New Testament scholars
Academic staff of Lund University
1926 births
2013 deaths
20th-century Protestant theologians
Lutheran biblical scholars
20th-century Lutherans